Team Tibet is a sporting organization representing Tibetan exiles formed in India, 2001 as the Tibetan National football team.  The group planned to participate in Beijing in the 2008 Summer Olympics as Tibet to highlight their cause, but their request was rejected by the IOC.

See also
Tibetan Olympics 2008

External links
 A similar organization, Tibet Sports Association

2008 Summer Olympics